is an anime television series based on the 1844 children's story of the same name by Hans Christian Andersen. It is directed by Osamu Dezaki and animated by TMS Entertainment. The first episode aired on May 22, 2005, on Japan's NHK network.

Cast
Tōru Nakamura - Narrator, Ragi the Bard
Ayako Kawasumi - Gerda
Rio Natsuki - Kai
Mayo Suzukaze - Snow Queen
Tetsuo Gotō - Red Troll
Takuma Suzuki - Blue Troll
Akio Ōtsuka - The Avatar of the Wind/The Devil
Masahiro Takashima - Carl (Kai's Father)
Noriko Hidaka - Nina (Kai's Mother)
Masako Jō - Yohanne (Kai's Younger Sister)
Junko Midori - Matilda (Gerda's Grandmother)

Plot
Gerda and Kai have been neighbors and best friends since childhood. Gerda is now eleven, Kai twelve. They were happy children who worked and played as they should. All that changed when the Snow Queen's mirror broke. The shards spread all through the world, each containing evil. If a shard went inside your eye, it would turn your heart to ice. A shard went into Kai's eye. After that, he grew cold to those he loved. One night, the Snow Queen came after him. She took him into her carriage and they went back to her ice castle at the farthest north point of the world. Everyone in Kai and Gerda's village didn't know where he went and believed he died from drowning in the frozen-over lake. Gerda doesn't believe this, for she dreamed of seeing Kai enter the carriage. When a drunk man admits that he also saw this, Gerda starts realizing that maybe what she saw wasn't a dream. She packs her things and goes on a journey to save Kai and bring him back home.

Episodes

Music
Opening Theme:
"Snow Diamond" Composition and arrangement Akira Senju, Violin performance by Mariko Senju
Ending Theme:
"Daisuki na kimi ni" (Towards You, My Beloved) by Kazumasa Oda
Music by Akira Senju

References

External links
NHK's Snow Queen website 
Vap's Snow Queen website 

 
Review at THEM Anime

Anime and manga based on fairy tales
Works based on The Snow Queen
2006 Japanese television series endings
TMS Entertainment
NHK original programming
Television shows based on works by Hans Christian Andersen